Yaznee Nasheeda (born 8 September 1977) is a Maldivian middle-distance runner. She competed in the women's 800 metres at the 1996 Summer Olympics.

References

External links
 

1977 births
Living people
Athletes (track and field) at the 1996 Summer Olympics
Maldivian female middle-distance runners
Olympic athletes of the Maldives
Place of birth missing (living people)
Athletes (track and field) at the 1998 Asian Games
Asian Games competitors for the Maldives